Penny le Noble (born 2 February 1972) is a Dutch softball player. She competed in the women's tournament at the 1996 Summer Olympics.

References

External links
 

1972 births
Living people
Dutch softball players
Olympic softball players of the Netherlands
Softball players at the 1996 Summer Olympics
Sportspeople from Haarlem